Wolfram Saenger (born 1939) is a German biochemist and protein crystallographer. In his research career spanning over 30 years he has worked at the Max Planck Institute for Experimental Medicine, Harvard University (Harvard Medical School) and the Free University of Berlin, where he led the Institute for Crystallography research until his retirement in 2011. A recipient of the Gottfried Wilhelm Leibniz Prize (1987) of the Deutsche Forschungsgemeinschaft, which is the highest honor awarded for achievements in research in Germany, and the Humboldt Prize (1988), he is best known for his research on X-ray crystallography of membrane proteins and protein-nucleic acid complexes. He has authored 10 books, including the venerated book 'Principles of Nucleic Acid Structure' published by Springer, and over 500 scientific articles.

He is a fellow of the IUPAC and the National Academy of Sciences.

Partial list of major scientific contributions
 Water Molecule in Hydrophobic Surroundings: Structure of alpha-Cyclodextrin-Hexahydrate (C6H10O5)6·6H2O, Nature, 1972
 Circular hydrogen bonds, Nature, 1979
 Specific protein-nucleic acid recognition in ribonuclease T1−2'-guanylic acid complex: an X-ray study, Nature 1982
 DNA conformation is determined by economics in the hydration of phosphate groups, Nature 1986
 Long-range structural changes in proteinase K triggered by calcium ion removal, Nature  1989
 Three-dimensional structure of the E. coli DMA-binding protein FIS, Nature 1991
 Three-dimensional structure of system I of photosynthesis at 6 Å resolution, Nature 1993
 Crystal structure of beta-D-cellotetraose hemihydrate with implications for the structure of cellulose II, Science 1994
 Structure of the Tet repressor-tetracycline complex and regulation of antibiotic resistance, Science 1994
 Characterization of non-inducible Tet repressor mutants suggests conformational changes necessary for induction, Nature Structural Biology 1995
 Photosystem I at 4 Å resolution represents the first structural model of a joint photosynthetic reaction centre and core antenna system, Nature Structural Biology 1996
 Structural basis of gene regulation by the tetracycline inducible Tet repressor− operator system, Nature Structural Biology 2000
 Crystal structure of photosystem II from Synechococcus elongatus at 3.8 Å resolution, Nature 2001
 Three-dimensional structure of cyanobacterial Photosystem I at 2.5 Å resolution, Nature 2001
 Towards complete cofactor arrangement in the 3.0 Å resolution structure of photosystem II, Nature 2005
 Where water is oxidized to dioxygen: structure of the photosynthetic Mn4Ca cluster, Science 2006
 Cyanobacterial photosystem II at 2.9 Å resolution and the role of quinones, lipids, channels and chloride, Nature Structural & Molecular Biology 2009

External links
Research Group of Prof. Wolfram Saenger

1939 births
Living people
German biochemists
Gottfried Wilhelm Leibniz Prize winners
Harvard Medical School alumni